Disposable income is total personal income minus current income taxes. In national accounts definitions, personal income minus personal current taxes equals disposable personal income. Subtracting personal outlays (which includes the major category of personal [or private] consumption expenditure) yields personal (or, private) savings, hence the income left after paying away all the taxes is referred to as disposable income.

Restated, consumption expenditure plus savings equals disposable income after accounting for transfers such as payments to children in school or elderly parents’ living and care arrangements.

The marginal propensity to consume (MPC) is the fraction of a change in disposable income that is consumed. For example, if disposable income rises by $100, and $65 of that $100 is consumed, the MPC is 65%. Restated, the marginal propensity to save is 35%.

For the purposes of calculating the amount of income subject to garnishments, United States' federal law defines disposable income as an individual's compensation (including salary, overtime, bonuses, commission, and paid leave) after the deduction of health insurance premiums and any amounts required to be deducted by law. Amounts required to be deducted by law include federal, state, and local taxes, state unemployment and disability taxes, social security taxes, and other garnishments or levies, but does not include such deductions as voluntary retirement contributions and transportation deductions. Those deductions would be made only after calculating the amount of the garnishment or levy. The definition of disposable income varies for the purpose of state and local garnishments and levies.

Meanings of disposable income
Disposable income can be understood as: 

 National disposable income of a country: The national income minus current transfers (current taxes on income, wealth etc., social contributions, social benefits and other current transfers), plus current transfers receivable by resident units from the rest of the world.
 Disposable personal (or family/household) income: The income that individuals or households have for their spending.

Discretionary income
Discretionary income is disposable income (after-tax income), minus all payments that are necessary to meet current bills. It is total personal income after subtracting taxes and minimal survival expenses (such as food, medicine, rent or mortgage, utilities, insurance, transportation, property maintenance, child support, etc.) to maintain a certain standard of living. It is the amount of an individual's income available for spending after the essentials have been taken care of:

Discretionary income = gross income – taxes – all compelled payments (bills)

The term "disposable income" is often incorrectly used to denote discretionary income. For example, people commonly refer to disposable income as the amount of "play money" left to spend or save. The Consumer Leverage Ratio is the expression of the ratio of total household debt to disposable income.

See also 
 List of countries by disposable income

References

External links
 A simple discretionary income calculator—even though this says it's measuring "disposable income," using the economist's language, it's discretionary income.
 Eurostat, News Release No. 60/2010, Household Savings and Disposable Income, 30 April 2010
 Eurostat, Statistics Explained, Glossary article: National Disposable Income
 OECD Disposable income statistics
 Google – public data: GDP and Personal Income of the U.S. (annual): Disposal Personal Income
 Google – public data: GDP and Personal Income of the U.S. (annual): Disposal Personal Income per capita

Personal taxes
Household income
Family economics